Formicitylenchus is a monotypic genus of nematodes belonging to the family Allantonematidae. The only species is Formicitylenchus oregonensis.

References

Nematodes